Karl-Heinz Leesmann (3 May 1915 – 25 July 1943) was a Luftwaffe ace and recipient of the Knight's Cross of the Iron Cross during World War II.  The Knight's Cross of the Iron Cross was awarded to recognise extreme battlefield bravery or successful military leadership.  Karl-Heinz Leesmann was shot down on 25 July 1943, by a B-17 bomber that he was attacking.  During his career he was credited with 37 aerial victories, 27 on the Western Front and 10 on the Eastern Front.

Awards
 Iron Cross (1939) 2nd Class & 1st Class
 Knight's Cross of the Iron Cross on 23 July 1941 as Oberleutnant and Staffelkapitän of the 2./Jagdgeschwader 52
 German Cross in Gold on 27 July 1942 as Hauptmann in the I./Jagdgeschwader 52

References

Citations

Bibliography

 
 
 
 
 
 

1915 births
1943 deaths
Military personnel from Osnabrück
People from the Province of Hanover
German World War II flying aces
Recipients of the Gold German Cross
Recipients of the Knight's Cross of the Iron Cross
Luftwaffe personnel killed in World War II
Aviators killed by being shot down